Latika Nath is an Indian author, photographer and wildlife conservationist. Featuring her work, in 2001, she was awarded the title of 'The Tiger Princess' by National Geographic which featured her in a one-hour documentary film. She has worked since 1990 for the conservation of tigers in India. In May 2020, she was bestowed with  the honorary title of "Her Daringness" by Mr Nitin Gupta (former ministerial adviser, Australia ) in a cover story based on Latika's life and work, and featuring her work on wildlife conservation.

Early life and education 
Latika Nath was born to Professor Lalit M Nath and Meera Nath. Lalit Nath is ex-director AIIMS and was on the Indian Board of Wildlife and responsible for setting up the animal conservation movement in India in the 1970s. She spent much of her childhood visiting wilderness areas with her parents and received her sense of ecological ethics from them. Nath graduated in environmental science from the University of Delhi and was awarded a Chevening Award by The British Council to complete a master's degree in rural resource management from the University College of North Wales, Bangor, UK. She then obtained her D. Phil under the guidance of Prof. David Macdonald at the Wildlife Conservation Research Unit (WildCRU), Department of Zoology, Christ Church, Oxford. She was awarded a Research Fellowship at the Wildlife Institute of India and worked on Human-Elephant conflict resolution issues.

Career 
Nath started to work as an academician and worked as a consultant with various national and international organisations including IUCN, UNDP, UNFPA and ICIMOD on environment and wildlife. Nath has travelled the world to photograph various animal species (tigers, lions, cheetahs, jaguars, snow leopards, clouded leopards, Asian Elephant, the Gangetic Dolphin, the arna or wild water buffalo (Bubalus arnee)) and worked for their conservation. She eventually changed her focus to work with the tribal communities and to resolve human-wildlife conflicts.

Notable works

Publications and films 
 Omo- Where time stood still – 2019. Limited Editions. Academic Foundation. 
 Nath Latika & Nath Shloka. Hidden India 2018 – a journey to where the wild things are. Limited Editions. Academic Foundation. 
 Rana, Latika Nath 2005 Takdir the Tiger Cub. Tulika Books. 
 Rana, LN 2005. Report on the status of large mammalian species and identification of biological corridors in the Khangchenjunga Conservation Landscape. ICIMOD, Nepal
 Rana LN 2002. Conservation of Wetland Fauna in Nepal. Proceedings of the River Symposium 2002, Brisbane, Australia.
 C. Carbone1, S. Christie, K. Conforti, T. Coulson, N. Franklin, J. R. Ginsberg, M. Griffiths, J. Holden, M. Kinnaird, R. Laidlaw, A. Lynam, D. W. MacDonald, D. Martyr, C. McDougal, L. Nath, T. O'Brien, J. Seidensticker, J. L. D. Smith, R. Tilson and W. N. Wan Shahruddin .(2000) The use of photographic rates to estimate densities of cryptic mammals: response to Jennelle et al. Anim. Conserv. 5: 121–123.
 Latika Rana – Tiger Princess of India. National Geographic Television.

Contributions 
 Remembering Great Apes – 2018. Margot Raggett. Wildlife Photographers United. 
 Macdonald, David 2001 The New Encyclopaedia of Mammals. Oxford University Press. 
 Riding the Tiger: Tiger Conservation in Human-Dominated Landscapes. 1999. Seidensticker J, Christie S and Jackson P. 
 National Geographic. December 1997. Vol. 192. No 6. Wild Tigers
 A Tiger's Tale. BBC Wildlife
 Wild Things – Latika Nath ( Discovery Channel)
 A Tale of Two Tigers. BBC Wildlife

Exhibitions
 Omo – where time stood still. The Bikaner House, New Delhi. 5–12 November 2018
 Omo – a preview. The Corridor Project @The Quorum Club, Gurugram, Delhi NCR. 6 November – 6 December 2018.
 Participated in a Group Show – An Eye on the Tiger, The World's Largest Tiger Photography Exhibition by the World's best Wildlife Photographers. The Royal Albert Hall, 18 September – 14 October 2018
 Participated in a Group Show – Remembering Great Apes. La Galleria, Pall Mall, London, United Kingdom. 15–27 October 2018

Awards, honors and titles 
 Grant from Save the Tiger Fund for Camera Trap Development 1998–1999
 Overseas Research Student Scholarship
 Oxford and Cambridge Society of India Scholarship
 Foreign and Commonwealth Office Scholarship for the Year (Chevening Award)
 Research Fellowship, Wildlife Institute of India, Dehra dun, 1994 – 1997
 Karmaveer Puraskaar for Work in the field of Environment and Conservation
 Award from ATOI for contribution to Ecotourism in India 2007. National Geographic featured Latika in an hour long program called "Latika Rana – Tiger Princess" for a series titled "True Originals (USA)" and "Truth Files (Worldwide)"
 Latika was part of the campaign to launch National Geographic Channel in India along with Gerry Martin and Hritikh Roshan
 TEDxGurgaon 2012 Born to be Wild.
 TEDxSIULavale 2019. Tiger Conservation and more
 "Her Daringness" May 2020 - An honorary title bestowed  by former Ministerial Adviser Mr Nitin Gupta in a Cover Story based on Latika's life and work.

References 

21st-century Indian photographers
Indian wildlife photographers
Indian women photographers
Delhi University alumni
Alumni of Christ Church, Oxford
Living people
Year of birth missing (living people)
21st-century women photographers